Mohammad Azhar Shafiq (born 31 December 1978 in Sadiqabad, Punjab, Pakistan) is a Pakistani cricketer. He is a left-handed batsman and a right-arm medium pace bowler. To date, he has played 131 first-class and 60 List A matches for various teams in Pakistan. Whilst he is yet to play Test cricket or One Day Internationals for Pakistan, he did represent them at the 1998 Commonwealth Games. Nowadays he is ready to play his in innings in politics.

References
Cricket Archive profile

1973 births
Living people
Pakistani cricketers
Cricketers at the 1998 Commonwealth Games
Bahawalpur cricketers
Pakistan Customs cricketers
Multan cricketers
Sui Northern Gas Pipelines Limited cricketers
Commonwealth Games competitors for Pakistan